Henry Grierson (26 August 1891 – 29 January 1972) was an English cricketer, barrister and author, who played cricket for Bedfordshire between 1909 and 1921 and for Cambridge University from 1911 to 1912.

Biography

Born on 26 August 1891 in Chertsey, Surrey, Henry Grierson was educated at Bedford School and at Pembroke College, Cambridge. His first Minor Counties Championship appearances for Bedfordshire came in 1909. He played 11 matches of first-class cricket for Cambridge University and gained his Blue in 1911 and 1912. He continued to play for Bedfordshire until 1921.

In 1936, at the age of 45, Grierson concluded that if he could "raise a sufficient number of good players of forty and over, we might be sharp enough to handle some of the school sides". He persuaded Sir Pelham Warner and Jack Hobbs to become President and Vice President of a new club, to be called The Forty Club, with members being forty years of age or older. The XL was adopted as its logo and the first game was played against Wellingborough School in June 1937. 

Henry Grierson died in Sunbury-on-Thames on 29 January 1972, aged 80.

Publications
The Ramblings of a Rabbit (1924)

References

1891 births
1972 deaths
People educated at Bedford School
Alumni of Pembroke College, Cambridge
English cricketers
Bedfordshire cricketers
Cambridge University cricketers
Sportspeople from Chertsey